The House of the Seven Gables or House of the Seven Gables refer primarily to:

House of the Seven Gables, a 1668 colonial mansion in Salem, Massachusetts made famous by the Hawthorne novel
The House of the Seven Gables (1851), a novel by Nathaniel Hawthorne, inspired by the house and its history

The terms may also refer to:
House of the Seven Gables (Mayo, Florida), an octagonal house inspired by the novel
The House of the Seven Gables (1910 film), the first film adaptation of the novel, starring Mary Fuller
The House of the Seven Gables (film), the 1940 adaption of the novel